Ian Andrew Wallace (born 23 May 1956) is a Scottish former football player and manager. He played as a striker in the 1970s and 1980s for Dumbarton, Coventry City, Nottingham Forest, Brest, Sunderland, Marítimo and Melbourne Croatia. Wallace played in three international matches for Scotland in the late 1970s.

Playing career

Career in Scotland
Born in Glasgow, Wallace started at Scottish Junior club Yoker Athletic. He then joined the senior ranks with Scottish Football League club Dumbarton.

Coventry City
Wallace was purchased for £70,000 by the then Coventry manager Gordon Milne in 1976. Milne paired his small frame with his larger strike partner Mick Ferguson. He emerged from a car accident whilst at the club sporting a deep scar on the forehead. He also suffered a detached a retina whilst playing for Coventry at Norwich. Coventry finished 7th in the 1977-78 Football League, their second best ever placing after the team of 1969-70. Unlike in 1969-70 they missed out on a UEFA competition place. Wallace played that season alongside Ferguson, Tommy Hutchison, Terry Yorath, Graham Oakey, Bobby MacDonald and Jim Blyth. Wallace scored 23 goals that season, his first of three in a row as Coventry's top scorer. He was later inducted in to the Coventry City Hall of Fame.

Nottingham Forest
Wallace moved then reigning European champions Nottingham Forest in July 1980 for £1.25 million making him one of the world's most expensive players. His first game was their UEFA Super Cup defeat to Valencia that summer. Wallace went on to be Forest's top scorer for the first three of the four seasons he played there, scoring 13 goals in each season he top scored.

Later career
Wallace moved to French club Brest for a short spell in 1984. He returned to English football with Sunderland around New Year in season 1984–85.

In 1986 he joined Portuguese club Marítimo. In 1987 he signed for Melbourne Croatia in Australia, where he ended his playing career.

International
Wallace scored his on his full international debut, a 2–1 win against Bulgaria in February 1978. Coventry team-mate Jim Blyth was in goal for Scotland. He then played in a 1–0 defeat in Portugal in May 1978 and in a 3–0 loss in Wales in November of the following year. All three of his caps came when he was playing for Coventry City.

Managerial career
Wallace returned to Dumbarton as manager in November 1996 replacing Jim Fallon. He was dismissed from this job in October 1999 and was replaced by Jimmy Brown.

Statistics

Honours 
 Coventry City Hall of Fame

References

External links

Scotland U21 stats at Fitbastats

1956 births
Living people
Scottish footballers
Scotland international footballers
Scottish expatriate footballers
Expatriate footballers in France
Expatriate footballers in Portugal
Scottish expatriate sportspeople in France
Scottish expatriate sportspeople in Portugal
Dumbarton F.C. players
Coventry City F.C. players
Nottingham Forest F.C. players
Stade Brestois 29 players
Sunderland A.F.C. players
C.S. Marítimo players
Scottish football managers
Footballers from Glasgow
Dumbarton F.C. managers
National Soccer League (Australia) players
Melbourne Knights FC players
Yoker Athletic F.C. players
Scotland under-21 international footballers
Scottish Football League managers
Scottish Football League players
English Football League players
Primeira Liga players
Association football forwards
Scottish expatriate sportspeople in Australia
Expatriate soccer players in Australia
Scottish Junior Football Association players
Scotland junior international footballers